Pierre Polo (born 24 April 1928) was an Italian racing cyclist. He rode in the 1954 Tour de France.

References

External links
 

1928 births
Possibly living people
Italian male cyclists
Place of birth missing (living people)
People from the Province of Pordenone
Cyclists from Friuli Venezia Giulia
Italian emigrants to France